Bradley  Douglas Paisley (born October 28, 1972) is an American country music singer, songwriter, and guitarist. Starting with his 1999 debut album Who Needs Pictures, he has released eleven studio albums and a Christmas compilation on the Arista Nashville label, with all of his albums certified Gold or higher by the RIAA. He has scored 35 Top 10 singles on the US Billboard Country Airplay chart, 20 of which have reached number one. He set a new record in 2009 for the most consecutive singles (10) reaching the top spot on that chart.

Paisley has sold over 11 million albums and has won three Grammy Awards, 14 Academy of Country Music Awards, 14 Country Music Association Awards, and two American Music Awards. He has also earned country music's crowning achievement, becoming a member of the Grand Ole Opry. Paisley also wrote songs for Pixar's Cars franchise ("Behind the Clouds", "Find Yourself", "Collision of Worlds" with Robbie Williams, "Nobody's Fool", etc.).

Early life
Paisley was born and raised in Glen Dale, West Virginia. He is the only child of Douglas Edward "Doug" Paisley, who worked for the West Virginia Department of Transportation, and Sandra Jean "Sandy" (née Jarvis) Paisley, a teacher. He has stated that his love of country music stems from his maternal grandfather, Warren Jarvis, who gave him his first guitar, a Sears Danelectro Silvertone, and taught him how to play at eight years old. In third grade, he performed for the first time in public by singing in his church. Initially, they were just going to have him play the song on the guitar instead of a piano.  But then the adults heard him sing the tune and said, "forget the choir, let's just have Brad do the whole thing."  After that, he never had to ask for a gig until he left Glen Dale.  He later recalled that "Pretty soon, I was performing at every Christmas party and Mother's Day event. The neat thing about a small town is that when you want to be an artist, by golly, they'll make you one." At age 13, he wrote his first song, "Born on Christmas Day", which later appeared on his album Brad Paisley Christmas. He had been taking lessons with local guitarist Clarence "Hank" Goddard. By 13, Goddard and Paisley formed a band called "Brad Paisley and the C-Notes", with the addition of two of Paisley's adult friends.

While in junior high, his principal heard him perform "Born On Christmas Day" and invited him to play at the local Rotary Club meeting. In attendance was Tom Miller, the program director of a radio station in Wheeling, West Virginia. Miller asked him if he would like to be a guest on Jamboree USA. After his first performance, he was asked to become a member of the show's weekly lineup. For the next eight years, he opened for country singers such as The Judds, Ricky Skaggs and George Jones. He would become the youngest person inducted into the Jamboree USA Hall of Fame. He also performed at the Jamboree in the Hills.

Paisley graduated from John Marshall High School in Glen Dale, West Virginia, in 1991, and then studied for two years at West Liberty State College in West Liberty, West Virginia. He was awarded a fully paid ASCAP scholarship to Belmont University in Nashville, Tennessee, where he majored in music business and received a Bachelor of Business Administration degree from the Mike Curb School of Music Business in 1995. He interned at ASCAP, Atlantic Records, and the Fitzgerald-Hartley management firm. While in college, he met Frank Rogers, a fellow student who went on to serve as his producer. Paisley also met Kelley Lovelace, who became his songwriting partner. He also met Chris DuBois in college, and he, too, would write songs for him.

Within a week after graduating from Belmont, Paisley signed a songwriting contract with EMI Music Publishing; and he wrote David Kersh's Top 5 hit, "Another You", as well as David Ball's 1999 single, "Watching My Baby Not Come Back". The latter song was also co-written by Ball.

Career

1999–2001: Who Needs Pictures
His debut as a singer was with the label Arista Nashville, with the song "Who Needs Pictures" (released February 1, 1999). In May of that same year, he made his first appearance on the Grand Ole Opry. Seven months later he had his first No. 1 hit with "He Didn't Have to Be", which detailed the story of Paisley's frequent co-writer Kelley Lovelace and Lovelace's stepson, McCain Merren. The album also produced a Top 20 hit with "Me Neither" and his second number 1 hit, "We Danced", both in 2000. By February 2001, the album was certified platinum.

Later in 2000, Paisley won the Country Music Association's (CMA) Horizon Award and the Academy of Country Music's best new male vocalist trophy.  He received his first Grammy Award nomination a year later for Best New Artist. On February 17, 2001, Paisley was inducted into the Grand Ole Opry. He was 28 when he accepted the invitation. PBS did a 75th anniversary concert special, in which Paisley and Chely Wright sang a song that they co-wrote called "Hard to Be a Husband, Hard to Be a Wife". This song later appeared on the compilation album Grand Ole Opry 75th Anniversary, Vol. 2. The concert would get a CMA nomination for Vocal Event of the Year. Paisley would later contribute to Wright's 2001 album Never Love You Enough, co-writing the tracks "One Night in Las Vegas", "Horoscope", and "Not as In Love". Paisley co-produced the former two tracks with her, in addition to playing guitar on them and featuring members of his road band, The Drama Kings; he also sang backing vocals on "One Night in Las Vegas" and "Not as In Love".

2001–2003: Part II
In 2002, he won the CMA Music Video of the Year for "I'm Gonna Miss Her (The Fishin' Song)". Several celebrities made notable guest appearances in the video, including Little Jimmy Dickens, Kimberly Williams, Dan Patrick, and Jerry Springer. His three other singles from the Part II album, "I Wish You'd Stay", "Wrapped Around", and "Two People Fell in Love", all charted in the top 10. The album stayed in the charts for more than 70 weeks and was certified platinum in August 2002. To support his album, he toured the country as the opening act for Lonestar.

2003–2005: Mud on the Tires
Paisley released his third album, Mud on the Tires (2003), following Who Needs Pictures and Part II. The album features the hit song "Celebrity", the video of which parodies television shows such as Fear Factor, American Idol, The Bachelorette, and According to Jim, and included such celebrities as Jason Alexander, James Belushi, Little Jimmy Dickens, Trista Rehn, and William Shatner. (Paisley later contributed to Shatner's album Has Been.) The album's title track, "Mud on the Tires", reached Billboard No. 1 in 2004.

In addition, the ninth track from Mud on the Tires, "Whiskey Lullaby", a duet with Alison Krauss, reached No. 3 on the Billboard Hot Country Singles & Tracks (now Hot Country Songs) charts, and No. 41 on the Billboard Hot 100. The music video for Whiskey Lullaby also won several awards and was rated No. 2 on the 100 Greatest Videos by CMT in 2008. The album was certified double platinum.

2005–2007: Time Well Wasted
In 2005, after touring with Reba McEntire and Terri Clark on the Two Hats and a Redhead Tour, he released Time Well Wasted which included the singles "Alcohol" reaching number 4,  "When I Get Where I'm Going" a duet with Dolly Parton, "The World" and "She's Everything" with the last three all reaching number 1. On November 6, 2006, Time Well Wasted won the Country Music Association CMA Award for Best Album. It also won album of the year at the 2006 ACM Awards.

Paisley also contributed two original songs to the Disney Pixar's film Cars. These can be found on the film's soundtrack. This was in recognition of his contribution to the "Route 66: Main Street America" television special.

At the 2006 Grammy Awards, Paisley received four nominations: Best Country Album (for Time Well Wasted), Best Country Song (for "Alcohol"), Best Country Instrumental (for "Time Warp") and Best Country Vocal, Male (for "Alcohol").

2007–2008: 5th Gear
Paisley's fifth studio album, 5th Gear, was released in the United States on June 19, 2007. The first four singles from the album, "Ticks", "Online", "Letter to Me", and "I'm Still a Guy", all reached number one on the country music single charts, making seven straight number one hits for Paisley.  "Online" featured the Brentwood High School marching band playing toward the end of the song, a cameo by Jason Alexander, and again featured a cameo by William Shatner. Throttleneck would also reach number one, which would get Paisley his first Grammy.

The fifth single from 5th Gear actually came from a reissued version of the album – a new recording of "Waitin' on a Woman", a track cut from Time Well Wasted. The reissued version received unsolicited airplay in late 2006, and features less prominent string guitar and violin parts and a more "muted" musical tone. For the chart week of September 20, 2008, the song became Paisley's twelfth number-one single and his eighth straight number-one hit, making him the artist with the most consecutive Number One country hits since the inception of Nielsen SoundScan in 1990.

Paisley toured April 26, 2007, through February 24, 2008, in support of 5th Gear on the Bonfires & Amplifiers Tour. The tour visited 94 cities over a 10-month period and played for more than a million fans. The tour was so successful that it was extended past its original end date to February 2008. Some of the opening acts who appeared during the tour were Taylor Swift, Kellie Pickler, Jack Ingram, Rodney Atkins and Chuck Wicks.

Paisley was nominated for three 2008 Grammy Awards related to 5th Gear: Best Country Album (for 5th Gear), Best Country Collaboration (for "Oh Love" with Carrie Underwood), and Best Country Instrumental (for "Throttleneck"). On February 10, 2008, he won his first Grammy award for Best Country Instrumental for "Throttleneck".

In March 2008, Paisley announced his next tour, The Paisley Party, a 42-date tour sponsored by Hershey's. The tour kicked off on June 11, 2008, in Albuquerque, New Mexico, with Wicks, Julianne Hough and Jewel as the opening acts.

2008–2009: Play

A sixth instrumental album, titled Play, was released on November 4, 2008. Paisley and Keith Urban released to country radio their first duet together on September 8, 2008, "Start a Band". It was the first and only single from Play, and it went on to become Paisley's thirteenth number one hit and his ninth in a row. The album also features collaborations with James Burton, Little Jimmy Dickens, Vince Gill, John Jorgenson, B.B. King, Albert Lee, Brent Mason, Buck Owens, Redd Volkaert and Steve Wariner. Paisley and Urban both received Entertainer of the Year nominations from the CMA on September 10, 2008. On November 12, 2008, Paisley won Male Vocalist of the Year and Music Video of the Year for "Waitin' on a Woman" during the CMAs.

2009–2010: American Saturday Night
Paisley announced on January 26, 2009, that he would be embarking on a new tour named American Saturday Night, with Dierks Bentley and Jimmy Wayne opening for most of the shows. Paisley's seventh studio album, American Saturday Night, was released on June 30, 2009. The album's lead single, "Then", was released in March 2009 and performed for the first time on American Idol on March 18. It went on to become Paisley's 14th number one single and his tenth in a row.

On July 21, 2009, Paisley performed at the White House for President Barack Obama and First Lady Michelle Obama in celebration of country music.  Country Music at the White House was streamed live on the White House website as well as a special on Great American Country.

On November 11, 2009, Paisley co-hosted the CMA Awards for the second straight year. He also performed "Welcome to the Future", and won both Male Vocalist of the Year and Musical Event of the Year for "Start a Band" with Keith Urban.

On March 1, 2010, Paisley was the first musical performance with "American Saturday Night" for the second tenure of The Tonight Show with Jay Leno.

On March 5, 2010, Paisley slipped and fell performing his last song of the set, "Alcohol", at a concert at the North Charleston Coliseum in Charleston, South Carolina, on the final date of the American Saturday Night Tour. Fearing a broken rib, he was held overnight at an area hospital, but was released when an MRI was negative.

On July 31, 2010, Paisley performed alongside Carrie Underwood at the inaugural Greenbrier Classic PGA Tour Event in Lewisburg, West Virginia. An estimated 60,000 people attended the outdoor event to watch Underwood and Paisley perform in the pouring rain.

On August 4, 2010, it was announced on his official website that Paisley would release his first official greatest hits package, entitled Hits Alive. Released on November 2, 2010, Hits Alive is a double-disc collection, with one disc containing studio versions of Paisley's hit singles, while the companion disc features previously unreleased live versions of his songs.

Paisley cohosted the 44th Annual CMA Awards on November 10, 2010, where he was also awarded the CMA's top award, Entertainer of the Year. During his acceptance speech, Paisley emotionally honored his grandfather, who inspired him to play the guitar.

In 2012, MSN.com listed American Saturday Night as one of the 21 Essential 21st-Century Albums.

2011–2012: This Is Country Music

In December 2010, Paisley released "This Is Country Music" as the title track to his eighth studio album, released May 23, 2011. The album's second single, "Old Alabama" (with Alabama), released to country radio on March 14, 2011, and became Paisley's nineteenth number one hit. "Remind Me", with Carrie Underwood, was released May 23, 2011, to radio.

On March 22, 2011, Paisley's website announced a new beta game titled Brad Paisley World. The game is modeled after other Facebook games such as Farmville or Mafia Wars and features original animation. The game provides a new way for fans to interact with each other and view exclusive material that would otherwise be unavailable.

On May 12, 2011, Paisley's website announced that he would release two songs on the soundtrack for the film Cars 2. One of them would be a collaboration with British pop singer Robbie Williams.

On September 21, 2011, Mailboat Records released Mark Twain: Words & Music, a double-CD telling Mark Twain's life in spoken word and song, including a new song by Paisley titled "Huck Finn Blues". Paisley's website announced that he was a fan of Twain, prompting his collaboration on the project with Clint Eastwood, Jimmy Buffett, Sheryl Crow, Vince Gill, and others.

On October 19, 2011, Paisley made a voice cameo as various background characters in the South Park episode "Bass to Mouth".

On January 14, 2012, Paisley was a guest on Garrison Keillor's Prairie Home Companion, during which he did a rendition of "Life's Railway to Heaven" by Charles Davis Tillman.

On April 25, 2012, Paisley was featured on the South Park episode "Cartman Finds Love", in which he voiced himself, sang the national anthem and helped Cartman sing the 1990s hit song "I Swear", which was popularized in 1994 by the country musician John Michael Montgomery and the pop group All-4-One.

Paisley extended his Virtual Reality World Tour through mid-2012. He toured the country and made pit stops at local country music festivals.

2012–2014: Wheelhouse

On September 20, 2012, Paisley released a new single, "Southern Comfort Zone". The song debuted at number 25 on the Hot Country Songs chart, becoming Paisley's highest debut to date. It reached number 2 on the Country Airplay chart in 2013. The song was the first single from his ninth studio album, Wheelhouse, released on April 9, 2013.

The album's second single, "Beat This Summer", was released to country radio on March 4, 2013. It also reached number 2 on the Country Airplay chart in July 2013. The album's third single, "I Can't Change the World", was released to country radio on August 19, 2013: despite a moderately good debut, the single failed to reach the top 20 on country charts, peaking at number 22 on Country Airplay and becoming Paisley's lowest-charting single to date. The album's fourth single, "The Mona Lisa", was released to country radio on December 9, 2013. It peaked at number 19 on Country Airplay.

On June 12, 2013, Paisley announced on his Twitter page that he would join the Rolling Stones onstage during the band's concert in Philadelphia.

His track "Accidental Racist", a duet with rapper LL Cool J, generated a bit of notoriety when it was released. Paisley sings about how he finds himself "caught between Southern pride and Southern blame": Paisley explained that he's proud of where he's from, but he's ashamed of themes such as slavery and racism. The song generated controversy for its discussion of racism, particularly the song's message of showing "Southern pride", which includes re-appropriation of the Confederate flag.

2014–2016: Moonshine in the Trunk
On April 6, 2014, Paisley released "River Bank". It is the lead single from his tenth studio album for Sony Music Entertainment, Moonshine in the Trunk, which was released on August 26, 2014. Paisley co-wrote the song with Kelley Lovelace and co-produced it with Luke Wooten. The album's second single, "Perfect Storm", was released to country radio on September 2, 2014. It reached number one on the Country Airplay chart in January 2015. The album's third single, "Crushin' It", was released to country radio on January 26, 2015. The album's fourth single, "Country Nation", was released to country radio on September 14, 2015.

On May 24, 2014, Paisley traveled on Air Force One with President Barack Obama to visit US troops at Bagram Air Base in Bagram, Afghanistan. Paisley played a full concert for the troops stationed there.

On June 1, 2014, Rolling Stone magazine ranked "Welcome to the Future" #100 in their list of the 100 greatest country songs.

In September 2014, Moonshine in the Trunk became Paisley's eighth number one album on Billboards Top Country Albums chart.  It also became his ninth Top 10 Pop album and fifth
album to reach #2 on the Billboard 200.

2016–2018: Love and War
Paisley released "Without a Fight", a duet with Demi Lovato, on May 13, 2016. It was to have served as the lead single to his eleventh studio album, but due to poor chart performance it did not make the album's final cut. He was selected as one of thirty artists to perform on "Forever Country", a mash-up track of "Take Me Home, Country Roads",
"On the Road Again" and "I Will Always Love You" which celebrates 50 years of the CMA Awards. The second single "Today" was released on October 6, 2016, which gave Paisley his first Country Digital Song Sales No. 1, opening at the top of the chart with 41,000 first-week downloads.
 The single landed in the No.1 spot on the Country Aircheck/Mediabase charts, marking Paisley's 24th No.1 song. On November 11, Paisley announced on Twitter that the title of the album would be Love and War, which was released in April 2017.

Love and War features several collaborations with iconic artists, including Timbaland, John Fogerty, Bill Anderson, and Mick Jagger, as well as a songwriting credit with Johnny Cash.

2018–present: New music

On October 4, 2018, Paisley and his wife Kimberly Williams-Paisley partnered with Belmont University and opened a free referral-based grocery store in Nashville to help the community in need. The board of trustees for The Store include Brad Paisley, president; Megan Zarling, chair; Pete Fisher, vice-chair; Doug Paisley, secretary and Elaine Bryan, treasurer.

In November 2018, Paisley released "Bucked Off", the lead single from his upcoming studio album. On March 11, 2019, Paisley released "My Miracle".

In 2021, Paisley was featured on Jimmie Allen's "Freedom Was a Highway", which reached number one on the Billboard Country Airplay chart in February 2022, becoming Paisley's twentieth number one single, and his first since "Perfect Storm" in January 2015. This distinction also tied Paisley with Brooks & Dunn and Toby Keith for the tenth most number one singles since the chart's inception in January 1990.

Books

Jug Fishing for Greazy and Other Brad Paisley Fishing Stories
Paisley released his book Jug Fishing for Greazy and Other Brad Paisley Fishing Stories in 2003 under Thomas Nelson Publishing. He co-wrote the book with author M. B. Roberts.

Diary of a Player
Paisley released his book Diary of a Player: How My Musical Heroes Made a Guitar Man Out of Me in 2011 under Howard Books Publishing. He co-wrote the book with author David Wild, a contributing editor for Rolling Stone magazine and an Emmy nominated TV writer and producer. The book is an autobiography and talks about Paisley's introduction to the music industry and how the events in his life helped to prepare him for what was up ahead. The book features topics such as the first guitar that his grandfather gave him, his first band the C-notes, the first song he wrote, and many more music/guitar related topics. Although the book does speak briefly of his personal life, the main focus is on his music and the start of his career.

Discography

Studio albums
 Who Needs Pictures (1999)
 Part II (2001)
 Mud on the Tires (2003)
 Time Well Wasted (2005)
 Brad Paisley Christmas (2006)
 5th Gear (2007)
 Play: The Guitar Album (2008)
 American Saturday Night (2009)
 This Is Country Music (2011)
 Wheelhouse (2013)
 Moonshine in the Trunk (2014)
 Love and War (2017)

Tours

Headlining

Time Well Wasted Tour (2005–06)
Bonfires & Amplifiers Tour (2007–08)
The Paisley Party Tour (2008–09)
American Saturday Night Tour (2009–10)
The H2O Tour (2010)
The iH2O Frozen Over Tour (2011)
H2O II: Wetter and Wilder World Tour (2012)
Virtual Reality World Tour (2012)
Beat This Summer Tour (2013)
Beat This Winter Tour (2014)
Country Nation World Tour (2014)
Crushin' It World Tour (2015–16)
Life Amplified World Tour (2016–17)
Weekend Warrior World Tour (2017–18)
Brad Paisley World Tour (2019)
Tour 2021 (2021)
World Tour 2022 (2022)

Co-headlining
Mud and Suds Tour (2005) 
Two Hats and a Redhead Tour (2005) 

Opening
Brooks & Dunn's Neon Circus & Wild West Show (2003)

Band
Paisley records his studio albums, in most part, with the backing of his live band, The Drama Kings. Their first gig together was May 7, 1999.

Current members
 Brad Paisley – lead vocals, lead guitar
 Gary Hooker – rhythm guitar
 Randle Currie – steel guitar
 Kendal Marcy – keyboards, banjo, mandolin
 Justin Williamson – fiddle, mandolin
 Kenny Lewis – bass guitar, vocals
 Ben Sesar – drums

Former members
 Jimmy Heffernan – steel guitar
 Ken Lush – keyboards
 Earl Clark – steel guitar
 Mike Johnson – steel guitar
 Jody Harris – guitar, mandolin, banjo

Personal life

Relationships
In the last months of 2000, Paisley had a relationship with fellow country music singer Chely Wright. Unbeknownst to Paisley, Wright and her female partner had moved together into a new home earlier in the year. In her autobiography, Wright expressed regret for how she treated him.

Paisley and Kimberly Williams began dating in 2001. The singer had first seen the actress 10 years earlier in her feature film debut while on a date to see Father of the Bride with a local girl. Four years later, and after his date left him for his best friend, he went to see the sequel alone. Paisley stated that he watched Williams' performance and thought "She seems like a great girl — smart and funny and all those things that are so hard to find."

Paisley's sophomore album, Part II, featured several songs he'd written about the old girlfriend, including one about going to see Father of the Bride. When it came time to cast the music video for "I'm Gonna Miss Her (The Fishin' Song)", Paisley said, "It felt natural to ask [Williams, the girl from the movie] to be in it." The two began dating soon after and were married on March 15, 2003, at Stauffer Chapel on the campus of Pepperdine University after a nine-month engagement. They live in Franklin, Tennessee, and had another home in Pacific Palisades that was sold in 2013.

Paisley and Williams' first son was born on February 22, 2007, in Nashville. Their second son, Jasper Warren (named after his grandfather, who bought Paisley his first guitar), was born on April 17, 2009.

Hobbies and other interests
Paisley is an active Freemason, a member of Hiram Lodge #7 in Franklin, Tennessee.  Paisley is a member of the Southern Jurisdiction of the Scottish Rite of Freemasonry, and a Noble of the AAONMS, also known as Shriners. He was accompanied by his father, Doug Paisley (33º), for the ceremony on October 28, 2006, and has done a number of recordings supporting the virtues of Freemasonry and DeMolay International. Paisley has described himself as a Christian.

He is also a lifelong fan of the Cleveland Browns and Los Angeles Dodgers. Paisley sang the National Anthem at Dodger Stadium before Game 2 of the Dodgers vs Astros World Series in 2017, and again before Game 3 of the 2018 World Series against the Boston Red Sox. Paisley also sang the national anthem before a Browns game during the 1999 season, and stated in an interview with ESPN his dream job would be to play football for them.  He also invited former Browns Quarterback Brady Quinn to a concert at the Blossom Music Center, in 2008.

Paisley is also a fan of West Virginia athletics.  In 2014, Paisley appeared as a celebrity guest picker on the popular ESPN show College Gameday, when it was held on the campus of West Virginia University.

In late 2009, it was announced in Variety that Paisley would enter the world of scripted television as an executive producer of a new hour-long drama series for The CW network called, appropriately, Nashville. The plot was written and created by Neal Dodson and actor Matt Bomer. The creator of the series One Tree Hill, Mark Schwahn directed the pilot and was to oversee the series had it been picked up. Actor Zachary Quinto was also an executive producer on the series, along with Dodson, Bomer, and Corey Moosa. The pilot was not picked up for a series when The CW's fall schedule was announced in May 2010. The CW project was completely unrelated to the  ABC/CMT series, of the same name, even though his wife had a recurring role in it, and he had two cameo appearances himself.

In 2021, Paisley released his own Bourbon brand called "America Highway Reserve." As this whiskey was aged in barrels in the "Rolling Rickhouse" semi-trailer that followed Paisley's 2019 concert tour, Paisley collaborated with Bardstown Bourbon Company to create this Bourbon.

Instruments

Paisley's first guitar, a gift from his grandfather, was a Silvertone Danelectro 1451, which came with an "amp-in-case". His next guitar, which he got at the age of 10 or 11, also from his grandfather, was a Sekova copy of a Gibson ES-335, with a Fender Deluxe Reverb. The instrument most often associated with him is a 1968 Pink Paisley Fender Telecaster. Brad's main guitars are Crook Custom Guitars. These guitars are designed by Bill Crook and feature the paisley wallpaper in a variety of colors.

Like many Nashville-based musicians, he lost a number of instruments and other gear in the 2010 flood in Nashville, including a 1970s Gibson Les Paul and the prototype for a Z Wreck, one of the signature Paisley Dr. Z amplifiers. The insurance money, however, allowed him to buy (from George Gruhn's store) an exclusive 1937 herringbone Martin D-28.

In 2010, Paisley and Wampler Pedals released the Brad Paisley signature Paisley Drive, a guitar overdrive pedal designed to his specifications. Paisley has also used Audiotech Guitar Products ABY Selector's for controlling his wireless receiver units.

In 2015 Santa Cruz Guitar Company introduced the Brad Paisley Signature Model, B/PW, acoustic dreadnought guitar. Paisley is often seen playing this model of guitar, such as in the 2017 Netflix original Brad Paisley's Comedy Rodeo.

In 2016 Paisley and Dr. Z Amplification collaborated and released the DB4 model. The name DB4 is thus named because it is "Doc & Brad's fourth amp design". The pentode preamp tube is a 5879 with EL84 output tubes.

Filmography

Television appearances

References

External links

 
  Profile at Forbes
 Brad Paisley lyrics 

1972 births
21st-century American singers
21st-century American guitarists
21st-century American male singers
American baritones
American country guitarists
American Freemasons
American male guitarists
American country singer-songwriters
American male singer-songwriters
Arista Nashville artists
Belmont University alumni
Country musicians from West Virginia
Grammy Award winners
Grand Ole Opry members
Guitarists from West Virginia
Living people
Lead guitarists
Members of the Country Music Association
People from Glen Dale, West Virginia
Singer-songwriters from West Virginia
West Liberty University alumni